The Regatta of the Historical Maritime Republics (or Palio of the Historical Maritime Republics) is a sporting event of historical re-enactment, established in 1955 with the aim of recalling the rivalry of the most famous Italian maritime republics: those of Republic of Amalfi, Republic of Pisa, Republic of Genoa and Republic of Venice, during which four rowing crews representing each of the republics compete against each other. This event, held under the patronage of the President of the Italian Republic, takes place every year on a day between the end of May and the beginning of July, and is hosted in rotation between these cities. The regatta is preceded by a historical procession, during which parade through the streets of the city organizing some figures that play the role of ancient characters that characterized each republic.

History 

The idea of an event reminiscent of the events of the four seafaring powers of the Middle Ages was born in the late forties of the twentieth century by the Pisan knight Mirro Chiaverini. The proposal was first viewed by Carlo Vallini, president of the Provincial Tourist Board of Pisa, who, after having accepted it, turned it in turn to the municipalities of the other three cities to participate. The initiative was welcomed in a positive way especially by the lawyer Francesco Amodio, then mayor of Amalfi, who requested (and obtained) a meeting of representatives of the four cities involved to examine the proposal together. The meeting took place at the Pisa palace on April 9, 1949, but the agreement was not simple: during the discussion, Mr. Manzini, director of the Venice municipal office, showed his opinion against the participation of the tender rowing of the lagoon city, while being in favor of the parade in the historical parade. The lawyer Amodio tried, in his speech in defense of the regatta, to change his mind, underlining the importance not only historical but also tourism of the event. Given the strong agreement by Amalfi, Pisa and Genoa, the representatives of Venice took note of it and also joined the initiative.

Once the agreement was reached, there was a long process, in which the statute and the regulations were established, research was carried out in the historical archives and among the works of art the necessary elements to realize the costumes of the historical procession, the projects were designed of the boats and found the necessary funds to organize the regatta. On June 29, 1955 an experimental test was carried out in Genoa with "gozzi" to four rowers. On December 10 of the same year it was instead signed in Amalfi, in the Salone Morelli (the current Historical Museum of Palazzo San Benedetto, seat of the Town Hall), the constitutive act that sanctioned the creation of the Organizing Body of the Regatta. The boats, built by the Gondolieri Cooperative of Venice, were launched on June 9, 1956 on the Riva dei Giardini Reali, with the blessing of the Patriarch of Venice Angelo Roncalli (later elected Pope John XXIII). The first edition took place in Pisa on July 1 of that year; among those present stood out in particular the President of the Republic Giovanni Gronchi and the Minister of Merchant Navy Gennaro Cassiani.

The statute 
The Regatta provides a statute, which establishes the constitution of the organization, its purpose (that is to promote the event itself), and its composition. According to this statute, the Body consists of three parts: the Magistrates of the Regatta, the General Committee and the City Committee. The first part is the supreme body of the Entity, composed of the mayors of the four seafaring cities, whose office as First Magistrate is entitled to the mayor of the city hosting the event; the second is the collegiate technical-administrative body, whose chairman (who is in turn the president of the Citizen Committee of the host city) legally represents the Entity; the third is the technical body, appointed by the mayor and in office for four years, which provides for the conduct of the event.

The regulation 
Despite having undergone small changes over time, the regulation of the Regatta remained essentially unchanged.
Four crews take part in the race, each consisting of 8 rowers and one helmsman, more than the reserves. Previously the crews were trained by athletes born in the respective cities, provinces and regions, or there have been residents for at least ten years, but since 2004 it has been established that they must be composed half by athletes from the Region and for the other half by athletes from the Province.

Boats must be built with the same structural parameters. Before departure, they are weighed, and to be admitted they must not have (weighing less than 760 kilograms) (empty and including accessories, except for oars). Precisely to ensure greater efficiency and lightness in the water (while still within the limits), the boats, once built of wood, today are made of fiberglass. The four original galleons were designed built by Giovanni Giuponi. Each boat must be recognizable by the colors with which it is painted and by polene, or wooden sculptures (now also in fiberglass) placed on the bow that depict the animal symbol of each city, designed over the years Fifty from Professor Alvio Vaglini. For this reason, the Amalfi boat is identified by the color azure and the winged horse, the one of Genoa with the color white and the dragon ( which refers to Saint George, protector of the city), that of Pisa from the color red and from the eagle (which symbolizes the ancient bond between the Pisan Republic and the Holy Roman Empire) and that of Venice from the color green and the winged lion (which refers to Saint Mark the Evangelist, patron of the city).

The Regatta takes place on a 2 kilometer route, which differs depending on the location: in Amalfi it rests in the Tyrrhenian Sea along the coast, in Genoa in the Ligurian Sea within the port basin, in Pisa in the Arno river against the current and in Venice in the characteristic lagoon on the Adriatic sea. Before the start of the rowing race the lanes are drawn. The starting device consists of four fixed anchors aligned and the way is given by the referee judge. The jury, however, assesses the arrival, judging the "cut" of the finish by the polena of each boat (for Amalfi the tip of the front hoof of the winged horse, for Genoa the tip of the nymphs of the griffin for Pisa, the extremity of the eagle's claws, for Venice half the sword held by the winged lion). During the race, it is forbidden to invade the lane of an opponent, under penalty of relegation to the last place decreed by the jury. On the other hand, it is allowed to change the water number only if a crew takes a boat ahead of an opponent.

The winner of the Regata receives a trophy in gold and silver, made by the Florentine Goldsmith School, which represents a rowing galleon (like the one used for the race) supported by four hippocampus (mythology) below which the coats of arms of the four Maritime Republics appear. It holds it for a year, until the new raffling in the next edition. On the basis of the trophy, moreover, a medal with the symbol of the winning city of the Regatta is affixed from year to year; therefore there are as many medals as many disputed editions.

The historical parade 
The historical parade is the central moment of the whole event. Through it every Maritime Republic fully revives its glorious past, proposing episodes and characters that marked its history. The parade has also occasionally marched abroad, in particular in Berlin and New York City.

Amalfi 

The Amalfi procession represents the society of the Campania Republic at the beginning of the eleventh century, when it reached its peak. Inside there are representatives of the various social classes: the magistrates, the military and the people. In particular parade the duke (the highest city authority) and the knights with sword, whose vestments were later taken by members of the Order of the Knights of St. John of Jerusalem. The proposed episode is that of the marriage between John I, son and co-regent of the Duke Mansone I, and the regal salernitan noblewoman; the marriage marked for the young the passage to the adult age and entry into the political environment. The costumes for the Amalfi procession were designed in the fifties by the scenographer Roberto Scielzo, through analysis of historical sources. The realization boxes, as well as the clothes, are still exhibited in the Municipal Museum of the Amalfi Town Hall.

The layout of the parade is as follows: 3 rowers; 10 valets and the gonfalonier; 5 trumpeters; the consul of the Republic; 3 pages of the console; 2 judges; the sea console; 2 ambassadors; the Duke; 2 pages of the duke; 4 riders; 6 bearers; 4 ladies and 4 knights of the court; the groom and the bride; 6 pages; 4 tympanists; the navarca; 9 sailors; 9 archers.

Genoa 

The Genoese procession proposes the consular period of the Ligurian Republic, or rather before the taking of power by the doges. The episode depicted stars the leader Guglielmo Embriaco, nicknamed "Testa di maglio", who led the fleet of Genoa during the First Crusade. At that time he brought to Genoa the Holy Catino which, according to tradition, would be used by Jesus and the Apostles during the Last Supper. Another important character present in the parade is Caffaro di Caschifellone, the annalist who reported the deeds of the Embriaco. There are also representatives of the social classes: merchants, men of arms and the people.

The layout of the parade is as follows: 1 gonfalonier and 2 dealers; 3 bishops; 3 captains; the standard bearer with the flag of Saint George; 6 trumpeters; the bishop with the flag of Genoa; 6 tambourines; 1 armed with a broadsword; 3 washstand; the standard bearer with the flag of the Embriaco; the embroiderer's fingerboard page; the Embriaco; 3 bishops; 3 captains; the Caffaro; 3 armed with a sword; 8 nobles and 8 noblewomen; 2 crossbowmen; 12 people and commoners; 2 crossbowmen; 3 rowers; 6 armed with lance.

Pisa

Venice

Extraordinary regattas 
In addition to the annual events, extraordinary editions of the historical regatta were also held:
 On July 2, 1961, Turin, on the waters of the Po, on the occasion of the 1st centenary of the Unification of Italy. The race saw Genoa winner (1st), followed by Amalfi (2nd), Venice (3rd) and Pisa (4th).
 On July 23, 1983, London, on the Thames, where the Maritime Republics competed against four English crews and the winner was Venice;

Regattas

References

Boat races
Maritime republics
1955 establishments in Italy
July sporting events
Recurring sporting events established in 1955
Historical competitions of Italy